Shota Kimura may refer to:

, Japanese baseball player
, Japanese footballer